A Prize of Arms is a 1962 British crime film directed by Cliff Owen and starring Stanley Baker, Helmut Schmid, Patrick Magee and Tom Bell with early appearances by several actors including Fulton Mackay, Michael Ripper, Stephen Lewis, Geoffrey Palmer, Tom Adams and Rodney Bewes. Set in 1956, the film follows a criminal gang as it tries to rob an army pay convoy during the Suez Crisis.

Plot
Three criminals have hatched a plan to rob an army barracks. The troops are about to be dispatched to take part in  a war in the Middle East and there is believed to be a large amount of pay on the premises, to be shipped out with them.

The gang enters an army barracks, disguised as soldiers and proceeds to the pay corps headquarters where, under the guise of maintenance work, they make sure that the alarms are disabled — which will give them time to make their escape once the robbery takes place.

For the rest of the day they try to integrate themselves into the workings of the base, including being vaccinated for Overseas service, to avoid attracting attention. As night falls, they change into military police uniforms and head for the pay headquarters again, announcing on arrival that they have had reports of a fire. They begin searching the rooms.

Starting a small blaze, they then order the premises to be evacuated. With the building empty, they break into the safe and steal over £100,000. Starting several fires to cover their activities, they then withdraw, carrying a fake casualty in a stretcher. As troops rush in from across the base to put out the fire, the men drive off to a secluded spot on the base where they had left an army truck.

When an officer rings up the medics to check on the progress of the casualty, he is told nobody has arrived. Suspicious, he raises the alarm, and the whole camp is put on standby while the police are sent for. They are initially fooled into thinking the criminals have already left the camp. Meanwhile, the crooks successfully manage to escape from the camp by tailing onto the end of a convoy.

As the authorities slowly awake to what has happened, military police are dispatched after the convoy. After the truck leaves the convoy, it is tracked down by the army, with the criminals seemingly cornered in a disused country barn. They try to make a break for it, using a flamethrower to clear their path. Initially successful, they manage to outrun the troops, before their truck explodes.

Cast
 Stanley Baker as Turpin
 Helmut Schmid as Swavek
 Tom Bell as Fenner
 John Phillips as Colonel Fowler
 Patrick Magee as Regimental Sergeant Major Hicks
 John Westbrook as Captain Stafford
 Jack May as Medical Officer
 Frank Gatliff as Major Palmer
 Michael Ripper as Corporal Freeman
 John Rees as Sergeant Jones
 Tom Adams as Corporal Glenn
 Anthony Bate as Sergeant Reeves
 Rodney Bewes as Private Maynard
 Douglas Blackwell as Day
 Glynn Edwards as Breakdown truck crewman
 Stephen Lewis as Military Police Corporal (cashier's office)
 Fulton Mackay as Corporal Henderson
 Stanley Meadows as Sergeant White
 Garfield Morgan as Military Policeman
 Geoffrey Palmer as Military Policeman
 Michael Robbins as Orford
 Peter Welch as W. O. Elsey

Reception
Despite a positive reception by critics, the film failed at the box office.

The film was released on Region One DVD in May 2007.

References

External links 
 

1962 films
British heist films
British black-and-white films
1960s heist films
Films directed by Cliff Owen
Suez Crisis films
1960s English-language films
1960s British films